"Take Me with You" is a song recorded by Canadian country music artist Patricia Conroy. It was released in 1991 as the second single from her debut album, Blue Angel. It peaked at number 8 on the RPM Country Tracks chart in April 1991.

Chart performance

Year-end charts

References

1990 songs
1991 singles
Patricia Conroy songs
Warner Music Group singles